Kirillovsky (masculine), Kirillovskaya (feminine), or Kirillovskoye (neuter) is the name of several rural localities in Russia:
Kirillovskoye, Leningrad Oblast, a logging depot settlement in Krasnoselskoye Settlement Municipal Formation of Vyborgsky District of Leningrad Oblast
Kirillovskoye, Mikhaylovsky Rural Okrug, Rybinsky District, Yaroslavl Oblast, a village in Mikhaylovsky Rural Okrug of Rybinsky District of Yaroslavl Oblast
Kirillovskoye, Volzhsky Rural Okrug, Rybinsky District, Yaroslavl Oblast, a village in Volzhsky Rural Okrug of Rybinsky District of Yaroslavl Oblast
Kirillovskoye, Tutayevsky District, Yaroslavl Oblast, a village in Chebakovsky Rural Okrug of Tutayevsky District of Yaroslavl Oblast
Kirillovskaya, Arkhangelsk Oblast, a village in Fedorogorsky Selsoviet of Shenkursky District of Arkhangelsk Oblast
Kirillovskaya, Irkutsk Oblast, a village in Nukutsky District of Irkutsk Oblast